The Feast of the Assembly is a Yazidi festival.

As the greatest festival of the Yazidi calendar, it is called the Cêjna Cemaiya in Kurmanji, which includes an annual pilgrimage to the tomb of Sheikh Adi (Şêx Adî) in Lalish, northern Iraq. The festival is celebrated from 6 October to 13 October, in honor of the Sheikh Adi. It is an important time for cohesion.

If possible, Yazidis make at least one pilgrimage to Lalish during their lifetime, and those living in the region try to attend at least once a year for the Feast of the Assembly in autumn.

Description
During the festival, the whole community comes together, all tribal chiefs, religious dignitaries and authorities are together in one place and special performances, celebrations and rituals are performed, this includes processions, communal meals, theatrical performances, recitals of qewls, animal sacrifices and candle lighting, this festival is also celebrated joyously with dances, musical performances, markets, and games. It offers a great opportunity for young Yazidis to meet, date, and party.

During the first few days of the pilgrimage, thousands of pilgrims arrive at the Bridge of Silat, which symbolizes the crossing from the profane life into the sacred life. Everyone is required to remove their shoes, wash their hands in the river, and cross the bridge three times while carrying torches and singing hymns. Thereafter, they walk to Sheikh 'Adī's tomb. They circumambulate three times around the building before kissing the doorframe and entering. They take their places around a five-branched torch and watch the first evening dance. The evening dance, called Sema Êvarî, is performed on every evening of the festival. During the dance, twelve men, dressed in white, circumambulate around a sacred torch lit in the middle which represents both God and the sun. The twelve men sing hymns as they pace slowly and solemnly. They are accompanied by the music of three Qawwals, who are trained singers and reciters of religious hymns. Pilgrims also visit the sacred white stone located on top of the Arafat mountain next to the sanctuary, which is one of the three mountains next in the Lalish valley surrounding the temple. They walk around the white stone seven times, kiss it to show reverence and offer a sum of money to the guardian of the site.

On the fourth day of the festival, the garments that cover and decorate Sheikh 'Adī's tomb are washed in the holy water of the Zemzem spring, located in a dark cave. Religious hymns are sung as they are dried and hung back in place. The seven differently colored garments, which represent the seven Holy Beings reigning over the earth, are each to be separately taken off and ritually washed.

On the fifth day, a bull is sacrificed in front of the shrine of Sheikh Shems, who is one of the seven Holy Beings in Yazidism who personifies the sun. Three tribes, namely Qaidy, Tirk, and Mamusi, are tasked with bringing a bull to the centre of Lalish, and chasing it down to the shrine of Sheikh Shems, where it is to be caught and ceremonially killed. The meat is later cooked and distributed to the pilgrims at Lalish.

The last two days of the festival consist of a ceremonial sheep sacrifice by the locals of Ain Sifni, and bringing the funeral bier of Sheikh 'Adī', which is located in Baadre, to Lalish, where it is baptized, i.e. ritually washed, with water from the sacred spring. Religious hymns are recited as pilgrims begin to depart.

This festival corresponds to the ancient Iranian feast of Mehragan, which also typically involved animal sacrifice. The ceremonial bull sacrifice in particular has been shown to be similar with the ancient Iranian tradition, as the bull sacrifice takes place in front of Sheikh Shems, a solar being that shares a lot of similar traits with the Ancient Iranian solar deity Mithra, who is repeatedly depicted slaying a bull and who also had a festival, during the same season, celebrated in his honour.

References

Yazidi holy days
Pilgrimages